is a Japanese musician and songwriter. Born in Osaka Prefecture, his first instrument was the piano, which he began playing when he was three years old. By the age of 11, he had started to play acoustic guitar, moving to electric guitar at the age of 14. By the age of 17, he had developed an interest in western hard rock and heavy metal music and devoted himself to it.

Ohmura attended the Guitar Institute of Technology (GIT) from 2002 at the Musicians Institute Japan in Osaka. He met and played with Vitalij Kuprij and recorded the CD Nowhere to Go with Richie Kotzen, Mark Boals, and Doogie White.

Ohmura formed the band Cross Hard in 2005 and released Eclipse from East on 25 May 2005. In 2006, along with Cross Hard's bassist, Kaoru, he formed another band named Gloria and released the mini-album MOTIF on 26 March 2008. A second mini-album, Acrobatic Road, was released on 21 January 2009. Ohmura has played guitar on tour for Marty Friedman and has either been a member of or performed with various other bands and artists, such as Taiwanese pop singer A-Mei, Japanese singer Liv Moon (Akane Liv), jazz big band Date Course Pentagon Royal Garden (DCPRG), C4, Uroboros, and Babymetal. He is also an instructor at Musicians Institute Japan (MI Japan).

Discography

Solo
 Nowhere to Go (2004)
 Power of Reality (2006)
 Emotions in Motion (2007)
 Devils in the Dark (2012)
 Devils in the Dark: Final Edition (2014)
 Cerberus (2017)
 I.RI.S (2019)
 Angels in the Dark (2020)

With other artists
 Eclipse from East (with Cross Hard) (2005)
 MOTIF (with Gloria) (2008)
 Acrobatic Road (with Gloria) (2009)
 V.A. - SOUND HOLIC - Metallical Astronomy (2010)
 BlazBlue Song Accord 1 with Continuum Shift (video game, with A.S.H) (2010)
 BlazBlue Song Accord 2 with Continuum Shift (video game, with A.S.H) (2011)
 Hard Corps: Uprising (video game) (2011)
 Alter War in Tokyo (with Date Course Pentagon Royal Garden) (2011)

References

External links
 
 Takayoshi Ohmura's Twitter page
 Takayoshi Ohmura's Facebook page
 Takayoshi Ohmura's YouTube account
 ESP Musician's Guitar Gallery

Living people
1983 births
21st-century Japanese guitarists
Musicians from Osaka Prefecture
Japanese rock guitarists
Japanese heavy metal guitarists
Musicians Institute alumni
Babymetal members
Kawaii metal musicians